Abu al-Duhur Subdistrict is a Syrian nahiyah (subdistrict) located in Idlib District in Idlib. According to the Syria Central Bureau of Statistics (CBS), Abu al-Duhur Subdistrict had a population of 38,869 in the 2004 census.

References

Subdistricts of Idlib Governorate